Edward Joshua Poole-Connor (27 July 1872 to 20 January 1962) was an evangelical preacher and Christian leader whose ministry spanned a most turbulent period in British church life, from the time of Charles Spurgeon to the 1960s, and whose record and analysis of its events has been widely observed.

Bible League Quarterly
He edited this quarterly magazine, first founded in 1892 to defend the inerrancy of the Holy Scriptures. The magazine was started shortly after Charles Spurgeon's death. Following Spurgeon's lead in the Downgrade Controversy, he felt a strong responsibility to advocate ecclesiastical separation from churches he perceived to be in profound theological error. He wrote:

Founder of the Fellowship of Independent Evangelical Churches
The FIEC is an association of churches, affiliated together in distinction from the other nonconformist denominations, which Poole-Connor perceived to be falling prey to serious defection from historic evangelical doctrine and practice. He was a founder member of the International Council of Christian Churches and opposed the ecumenism of the World Council of Churches, which he regarded as apostate.

Involvement in The Lord's Day Observance Society
He vigorously supported the defence of the free observance of Sunday worship, and helped administer the Lord's Day Observance Society, opposing encroachments upon this liberty.

Secretary of the North Africa Mission
He served as secretary to the North Africa Mission, later known as Arab World Ministries, between his two pastorates at Talbot Tabernacle.

Restorationist
Like Spurgeon, and many Puritan and Evangelical predecessors he held Restorationist views about Israel's return.

Publications
 Evangelicalism in England (The Fellowship of Independent Evangelical Churches, 1951).
 Evangelical Unity (The Fellowship of Independent Evangelical Churches, 1941).
 Apostasy Of English Non-Conformity
 Denominational Confusion and the Way Out
 Why I Prefer the Authorised Version of the English Bible
 The Revised Standard Version
 Islam - What Is It?
 Mohammedism, An Elementary Catechism (Fellowship of Faith for the Moslems, 1959)
 The Teaching and Influence of Honor Oak
 The Coming of the Son of Man
 The Gateway to a Golden Age, Or Is Christ Coming Again? (Sovereign Grace Advent Testimony)
 Champion for the Truth, The Prophetic Messages (Sovereign Grace Advent Testimony)

Posthumous works:
 Christ's Millennial Kingdom (Sovereign Grace Advent Testimony, 1987)
 The World Council of Churches, Whence ... and Whither? A Brief Examination of the Modern Ecumenical Movement (British Evangelical Council, 1967)

References

1872 births
1962 deaths
19th-century evangelicals
20th-century Christian clergy
20th-century evangelicals
Evangelical pastors
Fellowship of Independent Evangelical Churches